Roman Korynt (12 October 1929 – 15 July 2018) was a Polish international footballer who played as a defender. Most of his career was spent with Lechia Gdańsk, spending over 15 years at the club. He also had short spells with Gedania Gdańsk, OWKS Lublin, and CWKS Warszawa. He received 32 caps for Poland between 1952–1959.

Biography

Early years
Korynt was born in Tczew in 1929. Both of his parents came from Kociewie, with his father's parents both being Greek emigrants with the family's name originally being Korinth. Originally his sporting passion started with boxing training with MKS Wybrzeże while also developing a passion for football at this time joining Grom Gdynia. Korynt joined Gedania Gdańsk in 1948 playing with the club for just over a season before being called up into the army.

Military service
In 1949 Korynt started his mandatory conscription, being placed in a unit of ordinary conscripts and not a unit of athlete conscripts. Zbigniew Piórkowski, a well known boxer who Korynt was friends with, ordered that Korynt should be in a unit with athletic conscripts. Korynt was then transferred to OWKS Lublin as part of his military service. His performances with OWKS Lublin caught the attention of the Central Military Sports Club and he was transferred to CWKS Warszawa in 1951 for the remainder of his military service. During his time with CWKS he made 15 league appearances and 6 in the Polish Cup. He left CWKS in 1952 after his military service was completed.

Lechia Gdańsk
Korynt moved back to the Tricity area where he grew up and joined Lechia Gdańsk. He made his Lechia debut on 15 March 1953 against Cracovia in a 0-0 draw. In his first season with Lechia they suffered relegation to the second tier, winning promotion the season after back into the I liga. In 1955 Lechia reached the Polish Cup final by beating Kolejarz Nowy Sącz, Wisła Kraków, Gwardia Warszawa and Odra Opole to play CWKS Warszawa in the final. Korynt played 4 times in the cup run, including playing in the final, which CWKS Warszawa won 5-0. The following season in 1956 was to see the biggest success in Lechia's early history with the team finishing 3rd in the I liga. At the beginning of the season many expected Lechia to be fighting for their position to stay in the league. Despite only scoring 25 goals in 22 games, performances from Korynt helped the side to limit the amount of goals they conceded with the team keeping 9 clean sheets in the 22 game season. After the 3rd place finish Lechia started to face a gradual decline in on-field performances, with the team being relegated to the II liga at the end of the 1962–63 season. It was in the II liga where Korynt has his greatest success in terms of goals scored, scoring 5 in the 1964–65 season. After Lechia suffered another relegation, this time to the III liga, Korynt played 7 times before he retired from professional football, having played his last game against Arkonia Szczecin. Korynt made a total of 340 appearances for Lechia, 207 of which were in the top tier. Korynt is currently the only Lechia player to have made over 200 appearances in the top division.

International career

On 25 May 1952 Korynt made his Poland international debut against Romania. In total he earned 32 caps for Poland between 1952 and 1959. His most famous international game coming on 20 October 1957 against the Soviet Union with Poland winning the game 2-1.

Personal life and death
His son Tomasz Korynt, was also a footballer.

He has been awarded with three decorations; the Cross of Merit in 1995, the Knight's Cross of the Order of Polonia Restituta in 2001, and the Order of Polonia Restituta in 2011.

Korynt is commemorated by a star at the MOSiR Stadium in Gdańsk. The "Avenue of Stars" commemorates the efforts and success of former players and coaches.

He died on 15 July 2018, at the age of 88. His funeral took place on 19 July at the cemetery in Pierwoszyno.

Honours
Lechia Gdańsk

Ekstraklasa 
Third place: 1956

Polish Cup
Runners-up: 1955

Awards

1995: Gold Cross of Merit
2001: Knight's Cross of the Order of Polonia Restituta
2011:Order of Polonia Restituta

References

1929 births
2018 deaths
Polish footballers
Poland international footballers
Polish people of Greek descent
Gedania 1922 Gdańsk players
KS Lublinianka players
Legia Warsaw players
Lechia Gdańsk players
Ekstraklasa players
I liga players
II liga players
Association football defenders
People from Tczew